Visa requirements for Indonesian citizens are administrative entry restrictions imposed on citizens of Indonesia by the authorities of other states.  Indonesian citizens had visa-free or visa on arrival access to 72 countries and territories, ranking the Indonesian passport 76th in terms of travel freedom according to Henley Passport Index. Indonesia is also a part of ASEAN and has visa-free access to these countries and vice versa.

Visa requirements map

Visa requirements

Unrecognized or partially recognized countries

Dependent and autonomous territories

Diplomatic and service passports

Visa-free access applies specifically to holders of Indonesian diplomatic and service passports visiting the following countries:

Agreement on visa exemptions for holders of diplomatic and/or service passports were signed with the following countries but not yet ratified:
 (signed on 1 November 2016)
 (signed on 21 August 2015)
 (signed on 21 August 2019)
 (signed on 16 October 2017)
 (signed in 2015)
 (signed on 22 May 2017)
 (signed on 5 August 2016)

Visa exemption due to having other visas
Although a visa is generally needed by Indonesian citizens who hold ordinary passports, some countries apply visa waivers providing the Indonesian passport holders are also in possession of a visa or residence permit for certain countries (mainly USA/Canada/UK/Schengen/Australia/New Zealand). Some countries who apply such rules are these:

 : Requires valid multiple entry Schengen visa ("C" or "D") or valid residence permit in any Schengen member states or previously used multiple-entry visa or residence permit of UK or USA, stay is within the validity term of the visa or the residence permit.
 : No formal visa required but multiple-entry Schengen visa is required.
 : Requires valid visa issued by U.K. Please read additional information.
 : Requires a valid visa issued by USA/Canada/Schengen states/UK and payment of appropriate fees.
: ETA available for holders of US B2 visa or Schengen C visa (with at least 3 months' validity left) at a fee of US$50 and for a stay of up to 90 days.
 : Visa on arrival for holder of valid multiple entry USA visa.
 : Requires valid multiple-entry visa or residence permit issued by a Schengen or EU countries for stay up to 15 days.
 : Requires visa issued by Canada, USA or United Kingdom valid for a minimum of 6 months on arrival. They must travel as tourists or on business for a maximum stay of 6 months.
 : Valid Schengen visa required or valid visas and residence permits issued by Romania, Cyprus and Croatia.
 : Requires valid visa from EU Member State, Canada, Japan, Korea (Rep. of) or USA, for a max.stay of 90 days.
 : Requires valid multiple entry Schengen visa ("C" or "D") or valid residence permit in any Schengen member states or valid visa and residence permits of Bulgaria, Cyprus or Romania.
 : Requires valid multiple entry Schengen visa ("C" or "D") or valid residence permit in any Schengen member states or valid multiple-entry visas and residence permits issued by Romania, Bulgaria and Croatia.
 : Requires visa issued by Canada, USA or any EU Member State for a max. stay of 30 days. Fee: USD 10.-. Extension possible.
 : Requires valid visa/residence permit (min. 6 months from expire date) for Canada, the US, UK, a Schengen Member State, Overseas/Dependant Territories of GB & Northern Ireland, Middle East GCC, Japan, South Korea, Australia, or New Zealand for nationals of Indonesia.
 : Requires valid visa for Canada, the USA or a Schengen Member State for nationals of Indonesia.
 : Requires valid multiple entry Schengen visa and stay up to 15 days.
 : Requires permanent residency in Canada, Japan, the United Kingdom, the United States (B1/B2 visa also accepted) or the Schengen countries.
 : Requires visa issued by a Schengen Member State or U.S.A., or not longer than the expiry of the visa, if the validity of the visa is less than 7 days.
 : Requires permanent residence permit of any EU or Schengen member states or a multiple entry Schengen visa (C). In case of possession of multiple entry Schengen type C visa, validity of the visa must be at least 5 days than the planned stay in North Macedonia.
 : Requires visa issued by USA/UK/Canada/Australia/any member countries of the EU, which has been used at least once to enter those countries AND must buy tourist card that is of US$30 on arrival.
 : Requires valid multiple entry Schengen visa ("C" or "D") or valid residence permit in any Schengen member states or permanent residence permits issued by the UK or Ireland (the validity of which is of 5 years or more) or valid visa issued by Bulgaria, Cyprus or Croatia.
 : Requires visa issued by USA or a Schengen Member state together with a passport valid for a minimum of 3 months from the arrival date for a maximum stay of 15 days.
 : Requires valid visa of USA/Canada/Australia/New Zealand and is travelling between one of those countries to/from a third country and hold a confirmed onward ticket departing within 30 days.
 : Online Application for Travel Authorization Certificate available for Indonesian passport holders who hold visa/residence permit/permanent residence certificate issued by USA/Canada/South Korea/UK/Schengen Convention countries, which may be valid or has expired less than 10 years prior to the date of arrival, or valid electronic visa issued by Australia/New Zealand by the time of arrival, or Japanese visa/visa waiver together with proof of record of entering Japan or confirmed onward ticket to Japan.
 : Requires visa for Canada, United Kingdom or the USA.

APEC Business Travel Card

Holders of an APEC Business Travel Card (ABTC) travelling on business do not require a visa to the following countries:

1 – up to 90 days
2 – up to 60 days
3 – up to 59 days

The card must be used in conjunction with a passport and has the following advantages:
undertake legitimate business in participating economies
expedited border crossing in all member economies, including transitional members
expedited scheduling of visa interview (United States)

Visa requirements amendment log

Non-visa restrictions

See also

 Visa policy of Indonesia
 Indonesian passport
 Indonesia to Launch Electronic Visa

References and Notes
References

Notes

Indonesian
Foreign relations of Indonesia